Maurice E. Smith (born February 14, 1977) is a former professional American football player who played running back for three seasons in the National Football League for the Atlanta Falcons and Green Bay Packers. An undrafted free agent in 2000 out of North Carolina A&T State University, he negotiated and signed his own initial NFL contract over a span of five hours, ultimately receiving the highest signing bonus of all undrafted signees.

External links
NFL.com profile
Atlanta Falcons bio

1977 births
Living people
People from Halifax County, North Carolina
Players of American football from North Carolina
American football running backs
Atlanta Falcons players
Green Bay Packers players
North Carolina A&T Aggies football players